Tak Dam (also Romanized as Tak Dām) is a village in Ojarud-e Gharbi Rural District, in the Central District of Germi County, Ardabil Province, Iran. At the 2006 census, its population was 29, in 7 families.

References 

Towns and villages in Germi County